Turkish Delight is a 1927 American silent comedy film directed by Paul Sloane for DeMille Pictures Corporation. It stars Julia Faye, in her first top-billed performance, and Rudolph Schildkraut.

Cast
Julia Faye as Zelma
Rudolph Schildkraut as Abdul Hassan
Kenneth Thomson as Donald Sims
Louis Natheaux as Achmet Ali
May Robson as Tsakran
Harry Allen as Scotty
Toby Claude as Nassarah

Preservation
A complete 16 mm print of the film exists at the UCLA Film and Television Archive.

References

External links

1927 films
1927 comedy films
Silent American comedy films
American silent feature films
Producers Distributing Corporation films
American black-and-white films
Films directed by Paul Sloane
1920s American films